Sandeep Singh Maan (born 16 July 1993) is an Indian Para athlete competing in Men's 100m, 200m, 400m and Long Jump events in the T46 category. He is bronze medallist in Asian Para Games 2018 held in Jakarta, Indonesia. And three time silver medallist from the Asian Para Games; he won them at the 2010 and 2014 editions in Guangzhou, China  and Incheon, Korea, respectively. He received the Arjuna award in 2016 for his outstanding sporting achievements, the Maharana pratap Award in 2012 from state sports council of Rajasthan, and the Aravali Award in 2019. He is a national  record holder  in 200m and 400m since 2012 . And now his goal is towards winning medal in coming  Para Commonwealth games 2022.

Early life and background
Sandeep was born in 1993 in Hanumangarh, Rajasthan and suffered from a dysfunctional left arm by birth. He was inclined to sport from a very early age and used to compete in running events with regular able-bodied individuals during his school days. He started winning multiple medals across different events. Following his impressive performances agaiable-bodied competitors, Sandeep stepped into sports for the differently abled and soon started representing India at the international level in Para sports. His early training gave by Dronacharya Awardee R. D. Singh.

Career
Sandeep gained national prominence after winning the silver medal for India at the 2010 Asian Para Games in Guangzhou, China. He replicated his fine form the following year at the 2011 IWAS World Games in Sharjah (UAE), where he won gold medals in both 200m and 400m running events with a timing of 51.65 sec and 23.24 sec, respectively.

Sandeep began 2014 with a bang, winning gold medals in both 200m and 400m and even securing a bronze in Long Jump at the FAZAA International Athletics Competition in Dubai (UAE). The same year Sandeep added to his ever increasing international medal tally when he won two silver medals in his native running events at the 2014 Asian Para Games.

Sandeep currently trains at the Nehru Stadium in New Delhi under Dronacharya Awardee coach Satyapal Singh.  He idolises fellow Indian para-athlete Devendra Jhajharia, a Paralympic gold medalist, and considers him like an elder brother. Like his illustrious counterpart, Sandeep represents one of India's biggest medal hopes at this year's  Asian Para Game.  He is awarded with arjuna award 2016. Currently he is a National record holder in 200m and 400m since 2012.

References

External links

1993 births
Living people
Recipients of the Arjuna Award
Indian male sprinters
Indian male long jumpers
Medalists at the 2010 Asian Para Games
Medalists at the 2014 Asian Para Games
Medalists at the 2018 Asian Para Games
21st-century Indian people